Palexpo is a convention center in Geneva, Switzerland. The buildings are owned by the canton of Geneva while the company is a semi-private foundation. The center is located close to Geneva International Airport. There are seven halls, and 102,000 square metres of exhibition space. The Geneva Motor Show is held at Palexpo.

History
The construction of the Palexpo began in 1978, and the four first halls with 58,000 m2 were inaugurated on 18 December 1981. The Palexpo was then expanded three times: in 1987 with Hall 5, in 1995 with Hall 7, and in 2003 with Hall 6 built above the A1 motorway.

In early 2009, the Palexpo underwent a renovation project to enhance and improve the convention center's architecture, furnishings, and technology. During this renovation, the Palexpo Wi-Fi network was upgraded using Xirrus wi-fi arrays to provide wireless internet for all employees and guests.

Events
Palexpo hosts a variety of convention and sporting events, including the 2014 Davis Cup semifinals between Switzerland and Italy.

In 2001, the European Automotive Hall of Fame opened and inducted its first class of 13 members. Permanent plaques of honor will be emplaced at Palexpo. This is a European analog to the Automotive Hall of Fame which is now located in Dearborn, Michigan, and which has been in operation since 1936.

In 2019, it will host the third edition of the Laver Cup.

Depeche Mode performed at the convention centre on November 10, 2009, during their Tour of the Universe.

It would host the final weekend of the 2028 European Men's Handball Championship in which Switzerland will co-host.

See also
SEG Geneva Arena (Hall 7)

References

External links

 

Buildings and structures in Geneva
Entertainment venues in Geneva
Tourist attractions in Geneva
Convention centres in Switzerland
Indoor arenas in Switzerland
Buildings and structures completed in 1981
1981 establishments in Switzerland
20th-century architecture in Switzerland